Septin 2, also known as SEPT2, is a protein which in humans is encoded by the SEPT2 gene.

Function 

SEPT2 can hetero-oligomerize with SEPT6 and SEPT7 to form filaments. SEPT2 interacted with SEPT6 through its C-terminal coiled-coil domain. Knockdown of SEPT2, SEPT6, and SEPT7 in causes actin stress fibers to disintegrate and cells to lose polarity. Septins, SOCS7, and NCK1 are part of a signaling pathway that couples regulation of the DNA damage response to the cytoskeleton.

Interactions 

SEPT2 has been shown to interact with:
 SEPT6 
 SEPT7, and
 SEPT9.

References

Further reading